The Vermilion River is located in Saint Louis County of  northeast Minnesota, flowing between Crane Lake and Dago Bay of Lake Vermilion near Vermilion Dam.

The Vermilion River's width varies considerably, being the size of a large creek in places and looking like a large lake in another.  The Vermilion River passes through the community of Buyck in Portage Township.

As its name suggests, the waters of the Vermilion are a brownish-red color. The murky waters and the over-abundance of leeches make the Vermilion an undesirable swimming destination. Forests around the Vermilion, being logged about 50 years ago, are thick and hard to penetrate as many competing trees are closely spaced.

See also
List of rivers of Minnesota
List of longest streams of Minnesota

References

Rivers of Minnesota
Rivers of St. Louis County, Minnesota